Gilbert Ralph Clements,  (11 September 1928 – 27 November 2012) was a Canadian politician and the 25th Lieutenant Governor of Prince Edward Island from 1995 to 2001.

Born in Victoria Cross, Prince Edward Island, he was first elected to the Legislative Assembly of Prince Edward Island in 1970 representing 4th Kings. He was re-elected in 1974, 1979, 1982, 1986, 1989, and 1993. He held the following positions: Minister Municipal Affairs, Environment & Tourism, Parks & Conservation (1974–1978), Opposition Critic for Finance and Energy (1979–1986), Minister of Finance & Minister of Community and Cultural Affairs (1986–1989), and Minister of Finance & Minister of the Environment (1989–1993).

In 1981, he was interim Prince Edward Island Liberal Party Leader and opposition party leader. He became interim leader following the resignation of leader and former premier Bennett Campbell and served until Joe Ghiz was elected as leader.

Clements died at age 84, in Montague, Prince Edward Island.

References

1928 births
2012 deaths
People from Kings County, Prince Edward Island
Lieutenant Governors of Prince Edward Island
Members of the Executive Council of Prince Edward Island
Members of the Order of Prince Edward Island
Members of the United Church of Canada
Prince Edward Island Liberal Party MLAs
Prince Edward Island Liberal Party leaders